Chloe Louise Bibby (born 15 June 1998) is an Australian professional basketball player for the Perth Lynx of the Women's National Basketball League (WNBL). She played college basketball for the Mississippi State Bulldogs and the Maryland Terrapins.

Career

WNBL
Bibby made her WNBL debut with the Dandenong Rangers during the 2013–14 season. She played her fourth and final season with the Rangers in 2016–17.

On 2 August 2022, Bibby signed with the Perth Lynx for the 2022–23 WNBL season.

Australian state leagues
In 2015 and 2016, Bibby played for the Dandenong Rangers in the SEABL. She helped the Rangers win SEABL championships both years. In 2017, she joined the Bendigo Braves and helped them reach the SEABL grand final.

In 2022, Bibby played for the Kilsyth Cobras of the NBL1 South. She is set to play for the Frankston Blues in the 2023 NBL1 South season.

College and WNBA
In 2017, Bibby moved to the United States to play college basketball for the Mississippi State Bulldogs. In 2020, she transferred to Maryland, where she played two seasons.

In April 2022, Bibby spent training camp and preseason with the Minnesota Lynx of the WNBA.

National team
Bibby made her international debut, representing Australia at the 2014 FIBA Under-17 World Championship in the Czech Republic. Australia finished in fifth place. With the Gems, Bibby won Gold at the 2016 FIBA Oceania Under-18 Championship, qualifying for the 2017 World Championship in Italy.

References

1998 births
Living people
Australian expatriate basketball people in the United States
Australian women's basketball players
Dandenong Rangers players
Forwards (basketball)
Maryland Terrapins women's basketball players
Mississippi State Bulldogs women's basketball players